"Hermanos" (Spanish for "Brothers") is the eighth episode of the fourth season of the American television drama series Breaking Bad, and the 41st overall episode of the series. It originally aired on AMC in the United States on September 4, 2011.

Plot

During a pre-credits flashback, right after the deaths of Leonel and Marco Salamanca and Juan Bolsa, Gus Fring meets with Hector Salamanca and hints that he orchestrated Leonel and Marco's deaths out of revenge, phrasing "blood for blood", which then seems to infuriate the immobile Hector. The scene then changes to water slowly getting tinged red.

Gus is called to meet with the police and DEA, where he is asked about his fingerprints in Gale Boetticher's apartment. He explains that Gale was a recipient years ago of a UNM college scholarship in chemistry that Gus created, and says that Gale had invited Gus to his apartment for dinner to ask him for money. Hank Schrader asks if Gus Fring is his real name, as there are no records of anyone with that name in his native Chile. Gus says he immigrated at the time of Pinochet's dictatorship, which he claims was notorious both for human rights violations and poor record-keeping. The investigators are satisfied with his answers, except Hank, who is still suspicious. Meanwhile, Skyler White begins to hide Walter White's meth money in a crawl space below the house.

Hank later asks Walter to drive him to a mineral show, but reveals en route that he is really going to Los Pollos Hermanos to plant a GPS tracking unit on Gus' car. Walter is nervous since he is already on poor terms with Gus and because Mike Ehrmantraut has appeared and is watching him, but Walter ultimately gives in to Hank. Walter pretends to plant the tracker and goes inside the restaurant, where Gus meets him at a register. Walter hastens to assure Gus that he did not plant the tracker, showing it still in his pocket, but Gus tells him to "do it." Perplexed, Walter plants the tracker on his way back to his car and leaves with Hank. Later, Walter (on video) and Mike each assure Gus that Hank is acting on his own and not as part of the DEA's investigation, but Mike advises Gus that Hank may pose a problem if Gus and the cartel go to war. Walter warns Jesse Pinkman about Hank's investigation and again urges him to kill Gus. While at Jesse's house, Walter intercepts a text message meant for Jesse and suspects that Jesse is becoming loyal to Gus.

Gus goes to see Hector in the nursing home and asks him, cryptically, if today is the day. A flashback to 1989 in Mexico shows Gus and Max, his business partner and boyfriend, meeting with Hector, Bolsa, and their boss, Don Eladio. Gus and Max pitch their meth scheme to Eladio in hopes of going into business with the cartel. Max, who is a biochemist and chemical engineer, produces the meth, and the pair sell it out of their restaurant, named Los Pollos Hermanos after Gus and Max. Although Eladio likes the idea, he feels Gus has disrespected him by giving meth "samples" to Eladio's henchmen in order to manipulate him into a meeting. Moreover, Eladio wonders what Gus' purpose is in the business if Max is the cook of the high-grade meth. Before Gus can explain, Hector shoots Max through the head and forces Gus to lie down and look his dead partner in the eyes. Eladio tells Gus that the only reason Gus is alive and Max is not is because Eladio knows who Gus really is, and warns him that he is "not in Chile anymore." In the present day, Gus tells Hector to look him in the eyes, but Hector refuses. "Maybe next time," Gus says, and leaves Hector, who is fuming in his wheelchair.

Production

"Hermanos" was the first episode to delve into Gus Fring's backstory, although much remains unexplained about the character's past in Chile, which Gus seems anxious to keep concealed. Series creator Vince Gilligan has said Gus was likely involved in the military dictatorship of General Augusto Pinochet, but the writing staff had deliberately not determined the entire backstory. Gilligan said he believed this would make Gus a more interesting and mysterious character, while simultaneously allowing the writers greater flexibility in writing for him in future episodes.

Reception
The episode received critical acclaim. Alan Sepinwall of HitFix praised the episode, describing it as "another superb hour of season 4". Seth Amitin of IGN gave it a rare 10 out of 10. Donna Bowman of The A.V. Club gave the episode a "B+".

In 2019, The Ringer ranked "Hermanos" as the 16th best out of the 62 total Breaking Bad episodes.

Accolades
Emmy nominee Giancarlo Esposito submitted this episode for consideration for the Primetime Emmy Award for Outstanding Supporting Actor in a Drama Series for the 64th Primetime Emmy Awards. He ultimately lost to Aaron Paul for his performance in the episode "End Times".

Notes

References

External links
"Hermanos" at the official Breaking Bad site

2011 American television episodes
Breaking Bad (season 4) episodes